The Natchitoches (Caddo: Náshit'ush) are a Native American tribe from Louisiana. They organized themselves in one of the three Caddo-speaking confederacies along with the Hasinai (between the Sabine and Trinity rivers in eastern Texas), and Kadohadacho (at the borders of Texas, Oklahoma, Arkansas, and Louisiana).

History 
Natchitoches territory was along the Red River of the South in northeastern Texas and northwestern Louisiana, they were important allies of the French in the 17th and 18th centuries, played a major role in the subjugation of the Natchez in the Natchez uprising and the so-called Natchez wars.

In the early 17th century, the Natchitoches were joined by some of the remnants of the Kadohadacho, a tribe with many members who had been killed or enslaved by the Chickasaw. They settled on the Cane River around present day Natchitoches, Louisiana, which is a city named after the tribe.

Name 
Many historians have claimed that the name Natchitoches is derived from the native word nashitosh meaning "paw-paw people". However, Native American linguist John R. Swanton wrote that the word may actually be derived from nacicit meaning "Place where the soil is red".

Member tribes 
Member tribes of the historic Natchitoches Confederation:

 Doustioni or Dotchetonne (the exact settlement area is disputed today, some historians locate them in northeastern Texas, J. R. Swanton identified them as a Caddo tribe from the area around Bayou Dauchite in northwestern Louisiana, both are not proven. In the 17th century they were allies of the Kadohadacho tribe of the Kadohadacho Confederation; later, at the invitation of their French allies, they settled near the related Lower Natchitoches on the Red River; severely decimated by disease and war, they lost their independent identity and were absorbed by the other Caddo tribes)
 (Lower) Natchitoches (Caddo: Náshit'ush or Nashitosh) (lived in the vicinity of the French trading post Natchitoches in Northeast Louisiana; the Upper Natchitoches were part of the Kadohadacho Confederacy to the north)
 Ouachita or Washita (Caddo: Wishita – "good hunting grounds", (lived along the Ouachita River named after them and along the Black River (the name for the lower reaches of the Quachita River after the confluence of the Taensa River) in northeastern Louisiana, about 1690 they settled near Pargoud Landing near today's Monroe, Louisiana, joined the Natchitoches Confederation around 1720 due to losses from disease and wars)
 Yatasi or Lower Yatasi (Caddo: Yáttasih – "Those other people", lived in the area south of modern Shreveport in Northwest Louisiana, the French were welcomed by the Yatasi as allies in the fight against the then hostile Kadohadacho. At the beginning of the 18th century the Chickasaw killed a large number of Yatasi, so that the majority joined the Natchitoches Confederation, but a small splinter group - the Upper Yatasi - joined the Kadohadacho Confederation, were important intermediaries first with the French, later with the Spanish, even after the takeover of Louisiana by the Americans they kept the fur trade.)

Today 
Descendants of the Natchitoches along with other members of the Caddo Confederacy tribes are enrolled in the federally recognized Caddo Nation of Oklahoma.

In 2017, the state of Louisiana recognized The Natchitoches Tribe of Louisiana.

See also
Nacogdoche

Notes

References
 Edmonds, Randlett. Nusht'uhtiʔtiʔ Hasinay: Caddo Phrasebook. Richardson, TX: Various Indian Peoples Publishing, 2003. .
 Lauber, Almon Wheeler. Indian Slavery in Colonial Times Within the Present Limits of the United States. (New York: AMS Press, 1969 [originally published by Columbia University Press, 1913]) p. 30.

External links

Caddoan peoples
Native American tribes in Louisiana
Native American history of Louisiana